Olga Tass (married name Lemhényi; 29 March 1929 – 10 July 2020) was a Hungarian gymnast who competed at the 1948, 1952, 1956, and 1960 Summer Olympics. She was born in Pécs.

Gymnastics career 
Tass began gymnastics in 1941 but wouldn't be able to make her international debut until after World War II.  In 1948 she competed at the Olympic Games and won a silver medal in the team competition.  At the 1952 Olympic Games Tass won a silver medal with the Hungarian team and a bronze medal in the team portable apparatus.  At her third Olympic Games she won a gold medal in the team portable apparatus, a silver in the team final, and an individual bronze on vault.  She competed at her fourth Olympic Games in 1960.  With four Olympic appearances, Tass held the record of most appearances by a female gymnast at the Olympics until 2008, when Oksana Chusovitina competed in her fifth Olympic Games.

Coaching career 
Tass studied at the University of Physical Education, becoming a teacher in 1951, a gymnastics coach in 1978, and a gymnastics master coach in 1981.  She coached at the Újpesti TE prior to coaching the French national team from 1961 to 1968.

Personal life 
Tass was married to Dezső Lemhényi (1917–2003), a Hungarian water polo player who also competed in the 1948 and 1952 Summer Olympics.  She died on 10 July 2020 at the age of 91; she is buried in Farkasréti Cemetery.

In 2021 Tass was inducted into the International Gymnastics Hall of Fame.

See also
List of Olympic female gymnasts for Hungary
List of female artistic gymnasts with the most appearances at Olympic Games

References

External links 
 
 
 
 
 

1929 births
2020 deaths
Sportspeople from Pécs
Hungarian female artistic gymnasts
Olympic gymnasts of Hungary
Gymnasts at the 1948 Summer Olympics
Gymnasts at the 1952 Summer Olympics
Gymnasts at the 1956 Summer Olympics
Gymnasts at the 1960 Summer Olympics
Olympic gold medalists for Hungary
Olympic silver medalists for Hungary
Olympic bronze medalists for Hungary
Olympic medalists in gymnastics
Medalists at the 1948 Summer Olympics
Medalists at the 1952 Summer Olympics
Medalists at the 1956 Summer Olympics
Burials at Farkasréti Cemetery